Philippe I may refer to:

 Philippe of Belgium
 Philippe I of France
 Philippe I de Croÿ
 Philippe I, Duke of Orléans